The FastPort was a proprietary polyconnection interface used on all Sony Ericsson cellphones between 2005 and 2010. Designed in response to Nokia's  proprietary Pop-Port, FastPort provided data transfer, charging, headset and speaker connections through a common interface. It was discontinued in 2010 and replaced with a micro-USB for charging and data, and a TRRS connection for audio (headphones).

Functions

Transfer of data and files  

A USB FastPort-cable enables file and data transfer between a computer and a Sony Ericsson cellphone. Most models could act as a USB-storage-device, modem, phone and could load new firmware either with Sony Ericsson Update Service application, or with 3rd party software. FastPort was the interface to the PC to realize these functions.

Charging the battery/powering the phone  
The port can charge the battery and power the phone while it is connected to, for example, a hands-free solution in a car. The FastPort became the only way to get external power to the phones. Chargers comes in several varieties, from 12/24 volt DC to use in cars, to 100-250 volt AC to use elsewhere.  Some charger-models can only charge the phone (the cable is attached at the middle), in others all the connector pins through to the plug end, thus supporting data/signal transfer while the phone is being charged.

Sound accessories and headsets  
The port also connects wired headsets or speakers, etc.

Location
Originally, the FastPort was placed on the bottom edge of the phone (when viewed from the front), for a while on the top edge, and finally on the left edge. These changes caused some accessories to become unusable, such as holders with charging options and docks.

Layout
The connector has 12 pins for electrical connections (both power and data), 2 double-sided "hooks" on the plug and matching holes in the phones connector for keeping the plug safely in place. One hook contains a small polarity key to prevent the connector being inserted upside down. To help users identify the type of cable and see how to correctly insert the plug, a small symbol is placed on the side intended to be towards the front of the phone. Powerplugs display a small lightning bolt, headsets and hands-free-plugs show an old-fashioned headset, data-cables present a computer screen and music accessories reveal a note-sign.

External links
 Sony Ericsson FastPort pinout and interfacing

Electrical connectors
Sony Mobile
Mobile phones